The Palin Commission or Palin Commission of Inquiry or Palin Court of Inquiry was the first British Commission of Inquiry on the question of Palestine.

It was sent to the region in May 1920 by the British authorities, to examine the reasons for the Jerusalem riots, which took place between 4 and 7 April 1920. It foresaw increasing problems between the various parties and the administration.

The Commission completed its report on 1 July 1920 at Port Said, and submitted it in August 1920, though it was never published.

The report is held in the Foreign Office papers at the National Archives as document E9379 under FO 371/5121.

Commission operations
The Commission had three members, Major General Sir Philip Palin, who presided, Brigadier General E. H. Wildblood, and Lieutenant Colonel C. Vaughan Edwards and sat for 50 days. It examined 152 witnesses in eight languages (English, French, Arabic, Hebrew, Yiddish, Jargon, Russian and Hindustani), making the process more lengthy than usual.

The Zionist Commission was legally represented and used the inquiry to make a 'vigorous attack' upon the departing Occupied Enemy Territory Administration (OETA). The Palin Report noted that Jewish representatives persisted in describing the events as a "pogrom", implying that the British administration had connived in the violence. Arab Palestinians lacked interest, rarely attended the court and were 'by no means so well prepared'.

The OETA had been wound up by the time the report was presented in August 1920. Sir Herbert Samuel had become the first High Commissioner in 1920, before the Council of the League of Nations approved a British Mandate for Palestine, and OETA withdrew to Cairo in preparation for the expected British Mandate. Allenby advised that the Palin Report should be published; but in anticipation of Zionist objections, it was decided only to convey the gist of the report verbally to a 'responsible' Zionist leader.

Summary
 See: Palin Report conclusions
The report refers to various 'causes of the alienation and exasperation of the feelings of the population of Palestine'. It cites Jean de la Fontaine's lines in the original French to clarify the logic of events and the attitude of the local population:

Cet animal est très méchant
Si on l'attaque il se défend.
This animal is vicious.
When we attack, it defends.

It was sharply critical of the Zionists for exacerbating those concerns by their 'impatience, indiscretion and attempts to force the hands of the Administration'. There had been direct communication between the Foreign Office and the Chief Political Officer, Colonel Richard Meinertzhagen, bypassing and sometimes contradicting the Administration. In 1919 the Foreign Office, at Chaim Weizmann's behest, granted the Anglo-Palestine Bank a monopoly on providing mortgages, thus forcing the Anglo-Egyptian Bank to abandon its recently negotiated easy terms of 6 percent for the bank, and 0.5 percent for administrative charges.

The report was critical of some of the actions of OETA military command, particularly the withdrawal of troops from inside Jerusalem early in the morning of Monday, 5 April and that, once martial law had been proclaimed, it was slow to regain control.

Mention is made of the formation of the Haganah:'It seems scarcely credible that the fact that these men had been got together and were openly drilling at the back of Lemel School and on Mount Scopas [sic. = Mount Scopus] ... and yet no word of it reached either the Governorate or the Administration until after the riots.'

Lastly, the report expressed its alarm about the situation in Palestine, calling it 'exceedingly dangerous'. The Palin findings are similar to those of the Haycraft Report of the following year. The later report gives more emphasis to the Arab fear that extensive Jewish immigration would lead to Palestine becoming a Jewish dominion.

See also
Zionism
Anti-Zionism
Timeline of Zionism
1920 Palestine riots

References

Further reading
 A Broken Trust: Herbert Samuel, Zionism and the Palestinians by Huneidi, Sahar. (2001) .

External links
The Palin Commission report, full copy of the report published by Brendan McKay

1920 riots
1920 in Mandatory Palestine
Riots and civil disorder in Mandatory Palestine
Documents of Mandatory Palestine
May 1920 events